

Stephen Houlgate (born 24 March 1954) is a British philosopher and Professor of Philosophy at the University of Warwick. He is known for his works on Hegel, Heidegger and Derrida's thought.

Books
 Hegel, Nietzsche and the Criticism of Metaphysics, Cambridge University Press, 1986
 An Introduction to Hegel: Freedom, Truth and History, 2nd edition, Blackwell, 2005
 The Opening of Hegel's Logic. From Being to Infinity, Purdue University Press, 2006
 Hegel's Phenomenology of Spirit. A Reader's Guide, Bloomsbury, 2013
 Hegel on Being (2 vols.), Bloomsbury, 2021

Edited
 Hegel and the Philosophy of Nature, SUNY, 1998
 The Hegel Reader, Blackwell, 1998
 Hegel and the Arts, Northwestern University Press, 2007
 G.W.F. Hegel: Outlines of the Philosophy of Right, Oxford University Press, 2008
 A Companion to Hegel, with M.Baur, Blackwell, 2011

See also
Nietzsche and Philosophy
Elements of the Philosophy of Right
A History of Western Philosophy
Being and Time
Duncan Forbes (historian)

References

External links
Stephen Houlgate at the University of Warwick

21st-century British philosophers
Phenomenologists
Continental philosophers
Philosophy academics
Heidegger scholars
Living people
1954 births
Academics of the University of Warwick
Hegel scholars
Nietzsche scholars
Derrida scholars
Alumni of the University of Cambridge